Forever Today is an album by the Swedish band I'm from Barcelona, released in 2011. At the time of the recording, the band was made up of 27 members.

Critical reception
Paste wrote that "the whole thing plays like one long anthem, the score to an indie-pop opera." Exclaim! thought that "IFB's sound seldom feels crowded, often favouring a simple, but strong guitar or keyboard line to rally around, adding clever flourishes rather than competing melodies." The New York Times opined that the album "doesn’t suggest a collective venture so much as a well-upholstered solo project: less Broken Social Scene than the Polyphonic Spree."

Track listing

"Charlie Parker" - 3:04
"Get in Line" - 3:09
"Battleships" - 3:18
"Always Spring" - 3:11
"Can See Miles" - 3:22
"Come On" - 2:54
"Skipping a Beat" - 3:00
"Dr. Landy" - 2:40
"Game Is On" - 4:41
"Forever Today" - 3:32

References

2011 albums
I'm from Barcelona albums